Aaron Deer (born November 1, 1980) is an American songwriter and multi-instrumentalist originally from Indianapolis, Indiana, United States, now residing in Oakland, California. He is best known for his work in the Bloomington music scene in the early 2000s, playing with bands such as The Impossible Shapes, John Wilkes Booze, and The Horns of Happiness.

In the winter of 2009, Deer relocated to California and continues work with The Horns of Happiness, Royal Geography Society, Farmer Dave Scher and Wee Giant, among others, while co-running the Magnetic South cassette label.

Career
Deer began his music career in Indianapolis, where, along with high school friends Chris Barth and Peter King, The Impossible Shapes was formed. In 1999, Deer and Barth moved to Bloomington to attend Indiana University and they restarted the band there.  The group released their first record, "The Great Migration", in 2000 and followed with 2 subsequent releases with Indianapolis-based label Recordhead/Mr.Whiggs.

In 2003, The Impossible Shapes signed with Bloomington label Secretly Canadian released "We Like It Wild" and toured nationally and internationally.  Around the same time, John Wilkes Booze was reformed in its classic "Five Pillars of Soul" line-up.  After touring the western US in 2004, John Wilkes Booze was signed to Olympia, WA-based Kill Rock Stars.  His solo debut by The Horns of Happiness A Sea As a Shore was released by Secretly Canadian in 2004.

In 2005, Deer teamed up with drummer and visual artist Shelley Harrison to form the first performance version of The Horns of Happiness touring extensively through the US, sharing the stage with acts such as Man Man, Silver Jews, Old Time Relijun, Danielson Famile, Joanna Newsome, and The Dirty Projectors, among others, while garnering acclaim in publications such as Magnet, Dusted and Skyscraper magazines.

Discography

The Horns of Happiness
 A Sea As A Shore (2004)
 Would I Find Your Psychic Guideline EP (2006)
 What Spills Like Thread EP (2007)
 Weathering Alterations Soundtrack (2009)
 The Horns of Happiness EP (2010)
 Be Where Your Aim is Brave & Sound Cassette (2011)

Royal Geography Society
 Golden Man LP (2011)

The Impossible Shapes
 The Great Migration (2000)
 Laughter Fills Our Hollow Dome (2002)
 Bless The Headless (2003)
 The Current (2003)
 We Like It Wild (2004)
 Horus (2005)
 TUM (2006)
 The Impossible Shapes (2008)

John Wilkes Booze
Summer of Blood cassette (2004)
Five Pillars of Soul  (2005)
Heliocentric Views of...   (2006)

Wee Giant
 Weetoww (2008)

Organization of Robotic Rights Reform
ORRR Audio Awareness Disc (2008)

References

External links
Aaron Deer's homepage
  The Horns of Happiness website
The Horns of Happiness official Myspace page
  Magnetic South website
Secretly Canadian Records infopage
Review of "A Seas As A Shore" on Dusted Magazine
Daytrotter: January 2007
  The Impossible Shapes  website
Pitchfork review 2006
 Tour Press release
 Pop Montreal Review
  John Wilkes Booze website

American male singer-songwriters
Musicians from Indianapolis
People from Marion County, Indiana
Secretly Canadian artists
1980 births
Living people
Musicians from Bloomington, Indiana
Writers from Indianapolis
21st-century American singers
21st-century American male singers
Singer-songwriters from Indiana